Blair Lee may refer to:

Blair Lee I (1857–1954), United States Senator from Maryland, 1914–1917
Blair Lee III (1916–1985), acting Governor of Maryland, 1977–1979

See also
Lee Blair (disambiguation)